Dismidila vivashae is a moth in the family Crambidae. It was described by Schaus in 1933. It is found in Colombia.

References

Moths described in 1933
Midilinae